Thuli Brilliance Makama is a Swazi environmental attorney. She was awarded  the Goldman Environmental Prize in 2010.

References 

Year of birth missing (living people)
Living people
Swazi environmentalists
Swazi women environmentalists
Women lawyers
Swazi lawyers
Swazi activists
Swazi women activists
Goldman Environmental Prize awardees